Hockey Club Gornyak (Gornák Rýdnyı) is a professional ice hockey team that plays in the Pro Hokei Ligasy, the top level of ice hockey in Kazakhstan. They were founded in 1958, when Kazakhstan was part of the Soviet Union. Their team colors are black, white and red. They play at the Rudny Ice Palace.

Head coaches
 Sergei Mogilnikov, 2003–07

References

External links
 
Team profile

Ice hockey teams in Kazakhstan